The men's individual normal hill/10 km Nordic combined competition for the 2014 Winter Olympics in Sochi, Russia, was held at RusSki Gorki Jumping Center on 12 February.

Results

Ski jumping
The ski jumping was started at 13:30.

Cross-country
The Cross-country was started at 16:30.

References

Nordic combined at the 2014 Winter Olympics